Ferxxo (Vol 1: M.O.R) (stylized in all caps) is a 2020 studio album by Colombian singer-songwriter Feid. The acronym "M.O.R" stands for "messages on repeat" and is also a Colombian slang word. M.O.R. was composed by Feid and co-produced by Wain and Sky Rompiendo. The album became associated with the 2019–2020 Colombian protests when protesters began using lyrics on signs. It was nominated for a Latin Grammy Award for Best Urban Music Album.

Track listing

Charts

Weekly charts

Year-end charts

Certifications

References

2020 albums
Albums produced by Sky Rompiendo
Albums produced by Feid